The Wings of Freedom Aviation Museum in Horsham, Pennsylvania is a museum dedicated to preserving the aviation history of the Greater Delaware Valley including NAS Willow Grove and Harold F. Pitcairn. It is owned and operated by the Delaware Valley Historical Aircraft Association (DVHAA), a non-profit organization. Opened in 2004, the museum features restored historic aircraft, flight helmets, flight gear, air to air missiles, Martin-Baker ejection seats, and military service medals.

History
The museum traces its history back to the work of Lieutenant Commander David Ascher. Shortly after becoming the aircraft maintenance officer in May 1946, Ascher acquired a Curtiss TP-40N Warhawk from a local high school and displayed it at NAS Willow Grove. Later, through his efforts, an Arado Ar 196 was also added for display. Finally, in 1947, several captured Axis aircraft were recovered from Patuxent River and transported to the base for display.

Although most of the aircraft were later transferred to the National Air and Space Museum, Naval Aviation Museum, and other institutions, the Delaware Valley Historical Aircraft Association was able to found a new museum. Construction on the new building began in May 2002 and the museum opened to the public in 2004.

Aircraft on display
Aircraft are on display both inside the museum and outside on the ground, and include:

 Beechcraft T-34 Mentor
 Bell H-13G Sioux
 Bell UH-1V Iroquois
 Convair F2Y Sea Dart
 Douglas A-4M Skyhawk
 Fairchild Republic A-10 Thunderbolt II
 Fokker D.VIII
 Grumman C-1A Trader
 Grumman F9F-2 Panther
 Gyrodyne QH-50C DASH
 Kaman SH-2G Super Seasprite
 Lockheed P-3B Orion
 Lockheed TV-1 Shooting Star
 McDonnell Douglas F-4 Phantom II
 McDonnell Douglas F/A-18A Hornet
 North American FJ-4B Fury
 Piasecki HUP-2 Retriever
 Pitcairn PA-8 Mailwing
 Republic F-84F Thunderstreak
 Sikorsky UH-34J Seabat
 Vought F7U-3 Cutlass
 Vought F8U-1 Crusader

References

External links
Wings of Freedom Aviation Museum

Aerospace museums in Pennsylvania
Museums in Montgomery County, Pennsylvania
Military and war museums in Pennsylvania